Florida Gators tennis may refer to:

Florida Gators men's tennis, the University of Florida men's tennis team
Florida Gators women's tennis, the school's women's tennis team